Scott William Whyte (born January 8, 1978) is an American actor best known for his role as Chris Anderson on City Guys. He has also appeared in television series such as That '70s Show and Just Shoot Me! and the films D2: The Mighty Ducks and its sequel, D3, as different characters.

Career
Whyte made his film debut in the Mel Gibson/Kurt Russell feature Tequila Sunrise as a background character, having been cast after going to watch filming, as he lived near the shooting location. He and his brother were also cast as background characters in Over the Top after going to watch filming.

He landed his first part at the age of 13, appearing in a commercial for Pop Tarts, and later appeared in the television series That '70s Show, Just Shoot Me!, The Nanny, Full House and NBC's City Guys, along with hosting the television series Chicken Soup for the Soul, based on the best selling books.

His recent films include Reeker, The Fallen Ones, Voodoo Moon, Death Row and All In. He also voices Mr. Graham in the video game Mighty No. 9 and provides voices in Infamous Second Son Batman: Arkham Knight, Mad Max, Transformers: Devastation, Skylanders: SuperChargers and Counter-Strike: Global Offensive.

In 2020, Whyte became the new voice of Crash Bandicoot in Crash Bandicoot 4: It’s About Time, replacing Jess Harnell. In 2021, he also became the new voice of Captain Qwark in Ratchet & Clank: Rift Apart, replacing Jim Ward.

Filmography

Film

Television

Video games

Web

References

External links

20th-century American male actors
21st-century American male actors
Living people
American male film actors
American male television actors
American male video game actors
American male voice actors
Animal impersonators
Place of birth missing (living people)
1978 births